Andy Warhol's Bad is a 1977 comedy film directed by Jed Johnson and starring Carroll Baker, Perry King, and Susan Tyrrell. It was written by Pat Hackett and George Abagnalo, and was the last film produced by Andy Warhol before his death in 1987.

The opening screening in May 1977 attracted over 750 people, including Warren Beatty, Jack Nicholson, Julie Christie, and George Cukor. Tyrrell won the Saturn Award for Best Supporting Actress for her performance.

Plot
Hazel Aiken (Carroll Baker) is a Queens housewife and hairdresser who runs an electrolysis parlor in her home. Hazel shares a home with her sister-in-law and infant child and flicks lit cigarettes at her ineffectual husband. She makes extra money by operating a dirty deeds service, connecting clients with sociopaths who perform the jobs. Hazel only hires women, but when one of them can't do a high paying job, she agrees to interview a drifter L.T. (Perry King) recommended by one of the girls. Hazel also receives unwanted attention from Detective Hughes (Charles McGregor), a corrupt cop who wants her to surrender one of her employees so he can make an arrest. Hazel's female employees like P.
G. and R.C. wander in and out of the house and occasionally torture her sister-in-law with mean comments about her weight and absent husband. L.T. delights in this and does nothing to prevent it. 
When it comes time for L.T. to do his job, which is to smother an autistic child in his bedroom while the knowing parents pretend to sleep, things do not go according to plan. L.T. becomes frustrated when the kid does not respond to him and stares inert into space. Feeling sympathy for the child, he brings him to the parents' bedroom and yells, "Do it yourself!" When he returns to Hazel's to explain that he did not do the job, Hazel calls him "sensitive" and demands her rent money. Detective Hughes is also in the house, to Hazel's surprise, and they argue over their agreement. Hazel calls Hughes "picky", which enrages him and he drowns her to death in the kitchen sink. The sister-in-law walks into the kitchen and dispassionately takes Hazel's key to the dial phone's lock and unlocks it.

Cast

 Carroll Baker – Hazel Aiken
 Perry King – L.T.
 Susan Tyrrell – Mary Aiken
 Stefania Casini – P.G.
 Cyrinda Foxe – R.C.
 Susan Blond – Baby-Killing Mother
 Matthew Anton – Drugstore Boy
 Cathy Roskam – Drugstore Mother
 Mary Boylan -	Grandmother
 Gordon Oas-Heim – Mr. Aiken
 Michael Forella – Ice Cream Counterman
 Kitty Bruce -	Karla
 Tere Tereba – Ingrid Joyner
 Renee Paris -	Sara Leachman
 John Starke -	Joe Leachman
 Lawrence Tierney – O'Reilly-O'Crapface
 Ruth Jaroslow – Electrolysis Patient
 Tamara Horrocks – Angry Mother
 Charles McGregor – Detective Hughes

Production
According to Perry King, Andy Warhol wanted to make a movie about "bad women and incompetent men."

The film was written by Pat Hackett and George Abagnalo. "You come to use Andy's eyes to filter your own thoughts" said Hackett. "But your whole consciousness isn't Andy Warhol's world."

The budget of $1.5 million was more than three times any previous Warhol film and it was the first time a Warhol movie started with a definite script. Producer Jeff Tornberg raised the funds for production mostly through selling Europe distribution rights – Andy Warhol's Frankenstein had been a big hit. Filming started without an American distributor. "It was the excitement of the unknown", said Tornberg. "Everyone wants to know what Warhol can do with $1 million."

"We've always wanted to make a big movie but we've never had the money", said Warhol. "You can't go to an investor and say, 'Oh Holly will improvise, she'll think of something to improvise'. And we love the polish of a professional film. If you can direct this, you can direct anything."
The lead role was meant to be played by Vivian Vance but she dropped out and was replaced by Carroll Baker. It was Baker's first film in the US in eight years. Baker had been making movies in Europe where she usually had to take her clothes off. "I'm looking to get away from that", she said. "People don't realize you're acting. They just see you're sexy and they won't take you seriously."

The movie was made without Paul Morrissey and Joe Dallesandro, the director-star team from previous Warhol movies. Perry King played a Dallesandro-type role and says the crew would sometimes call him "Joe". Director Jed Johnson was Warhol's companion at the time.

King says he was cast without auditioning. He had just been in Mandingo (1975) which he says "was a big deal because it was kind of trashy. And trashy, to the Andy Warhol universe, was what they liked. Trash was big art to them."

Filming took place in June 1976 over eight weeks.

King said Warhol "makes no effort to communicate his concept of the film, but it's a strong concept. You begin to feel it. There is a short hand among these people. There is a very special Warhol world view here and it's hard to define. But it will lose its edge in the professional technique."

Perry King later recalled "we actually all worked very hard on that film. Both Carroll Baker and I worked very hard especially... I think it was their attempt at a mainstream film... It was cast like it was a Hollywood film."

"You can hardly call making an Andy Warhol movie a 'comeback'", said Baker. "It's more like going to the moon! The subject is totally unique. These characters are normal, sweet looking people who are monsters without knowing they are monsters. It's an attack on middle class morality. These people have no conscience whatsoever."

King says he and Baker struggled until halfway through the shoot. "We couldn't count on help from [director] Jed Johnson because he was just a kid and he didn't really know what he was doing", he said. They asked Susan Tyrell for help and she said they made a mistake reading the script. King says, "It sounded insane to me, but you know, she was absolutely right. If you're working on a Andy Warhol film you can't approach it like it's a conventional film with a beginning, middle and a end. You had to forget about the character arc... this was an Andy Warhol movie. You had to give yourself over completely to that world. You had to embrace that world and one of the things you did was to improvise everything. They didn't want to do anything conventionally."
 
Baker later said ""It had nothing to do with film-making, it had nothing to do with any other experience I ever had. It was like working on the moon. But he (Warhol) wanted me, he cast me in it, I wanted to do it, and it was such a big hit in Europe."

King says he, Baker and Susan Tyrell threatened to quit the film if they shot a scripted scene where a baby was thrown out the window. Jed Johnson promised not to shoot the scene but King says "the minute we finished shooting and had left--they went and shot that. As much as I hate it--it really fits in with the rest of that over-the-top universe."

Reception
Kevin Thomas of the Los Angeles Times wrote that the film "isn't so bad as it is merely morbid and depressing." Arthur D. Murphy of Variety called it "a compellingly revolting experience" and "an occasionally amusing outrage for the Warhol audience. Don't see it after eating." Vincent Canby of The New York Times called the film "a deadpanned, Grand Guignol comedy" that "means to be outrageous. It also presents the audience with a dilemma. If we become outraged and walk out, as one might in the baby-murder scene, it laughs at us: This is, after all, only a film, so why don't we become outraged at the various real horrors in the world around us? If we don't become outraged, says, the film, we may not be too different from the robots in the movie." Gene Siskel of the Chicago Tribune gave the film one-and-a-half stars out of four and wrote, "Beware of Andy Warhol's 'Bad.' It has very little of the artist's touch ... Right away you can see 'Bad' has Warhol-brand bad taste. But what it lacks is a strong sense of humor." Gary Arnold of The Washington Post wrote, "Johnson seems to have more technical polish than Warhol or Paul Morrissey, but the surprisingly crisp, professional cinematography on 'Bad' doesn't improve a rotten sensibility."

See also
 Andy Warhol filmography

References

External links
 
Review of film at Standard

Bad
1977 films
1977 comedy films
1977 independent films
American comedy films
American independent films
Films set in New York (state)
Films shot in New York (state)
New World Pictures films
1970s English-language films
1970s American films